Darren Dyer (also known by his nickname The Phantome, born 31 July 1966 in London) was a welterweight British boxer.

Boxing career
He was the ABA welterweight champion in 1986, fighting out of St. Monica's ABC.

He represented England and won a gold medal in the 67 kg welterweight division, at the 1986 Commonwealth Games in Edinburgh, Scotland.

References

1966 births
Living people
Boxers from Greater London
English male boxers
Commonwealth Games medallists in boxing
Commonwealth Games gold medallists for England
Boxers at the 1986 Commonwealth Games
Welterweight boxers
Medallists at the 1986 Commonwealth Games